Timur Zhakhanuly Sisenov (born 20 June 1972) is a Kazakhstani footballer. He played in one match for the Kazakhstan national football team in 1994.

Career 
Sisenov made his international debut for Kazakhstan on 17 April 1994 in a Uzbekistan Independence Cup match against Kyrgyzstan in MHSK Stadium, which finished as a goalless draw.

References

External links 
 

1972 births
Living people
Kazakhstani footballers
Kazakhstan international footballers
Association footballers not categorized by position
People from Shymkent